The wildlife of the Comoro Islands is composed of their flora and fauna.

Fauna

Mammals

The mammalian diversity of the Comoros, like most other young volcanic islands, is restricted to marine mammals and bats.

Birds

Flora
The country is home to 72 species of orchids.

References

Biota of the Comoros
Comoros